Matthieu Dreyer (born 20 March 1989) is a French professional footballer who plays as a goalkeeper for  club Saint-Étienne.

Club career
Dreyer began his career in Alsace playing for local club AS Ernolsheim/Bruche. In 2003, he moved to the famous Sochaux academy. During his youth career with Sochaux, he won the Coupe Gambardella in 2007. Dreyer was listed as the third goalkeeper for the 2007–08 season and appeared on the bench several times including two UEFA Cup matches, though he did not make an appearance. He signed his first professional contract following the season agreeing to a three-year deal. Dreyer was officially promoted to the senior squad and given the number 30 shirt, the common number for the third-choice goalkeeper in France.

For much of the 2008–09 season, Dreyer played in the CFA helping the Sochaux reserves finish a respectable 6th. He made his professional debut on 28 February 2009 starting in goal, ahead of second choice Jérémy Gavanon, for the injured Teddy Richert against Nice. For his efforts, Dreyer earned a clean sheet in a 1–0 victory with Václav Svěrkoš scoring the lone goal.

In 2012, after one season in the Championnat National, he joined Troyes as a second choice keeper. He agreed the termination of his contract in August 2016.

In July 2020, Dreyer joined Lorient, newly promoted to Ligue 1, on a free transfer having agreed a three-year contract.

On 23 August 2022, Dreyer signed for Ligue 2 side Saint-Étienne on a two-year contract.

International career
Dreyer has been a France international since age 12 when he earned caps with his local regional sides, Bas-Rhin and Alsace, in the Predator Cup. He has featured with the U-15s, U-16s, U-17s, and the U-18s. On 25 May 2009, he was selected to the under-20 squad to participate in the 2009 Mediterranean Games.

Honours 
Sochaux U19

 Coupe Gambardella: 2007

References

External links
 
 

Living people
1989 births
Association football goalkeepers
French footballers
FC Sochaux-Montbéliard players
ÉFC Fréjus Saint-Raphaël players
ES Troyes AC players
Stade Malherbe Caen players
Amiens SC players
FC Lorient players
AS Saint-Étienne players
Ligue 1 players
Ligue 2 players
Championnat National players
Championnat National 2 players
Championnat National 3 players
France under-21 international footballers
France youth international footballers
Competitors at the 2009 Mediterranean Games
Mediterranean Games competitors for France
French people of German descent